The Poldasht-Shah Takhti Bridge is a bridge located between Poldasht in the West Azerbaijan Province of Iran, and Shah Takhti in the Nakhchivan Autonomous Republic of Azerbaijan. The structure spans the Aras River, and serves as a border crossing that allows access to Nakhchivan without having to pass through Armenia. 
Construction was finished in 2007.

References 

Bridges in Iran